Pristimantis quaquaversus is a species of frog in the family Strabomantidae. It is found on the lower Amazonian slopes of the Andes from northern Ecuador south to the Cordillera de Cutucú and Cordillera del Cóndor as well as the adjacent northern Peru.

Description
Dorsum has shagreen skin that is pale brown to reddish brown in colour, with darker brown interorbital bar, chevrons or spots. Upper eyelid has a conical tubercle. Fingers and toes have discs but no webbing.

Habitat
The natural habitats of Pristimantis quaquaversus are tropical cloud forests and humid lowland forests. They can be seen on low vegetation at night. It is a common frog facing no major threats.

References

quaquaversus
Amphibians of Ecuador
Amphibians of Peru
Amphibians of the Andes
Amphibians described in 1974
Taxonomy articles created by Polbot